Cameron Rahles-Rahbula (born 9 July 1983) is a former Paralympic alpine skier from Australia. He won two bronze medals at the 2010 Winter Paralympics in Vancouver. He represented Australia in four Paralympics, stating with the 2002 Winter Paralympics in Salt Lake City and the 2006 Winter Paralympics in Torino. He did not compete in any events at the 2014 Winter Paralympics in Sochi due to knee and ankle injuries sustained during the warm up for the downhill event of the Games but carried the Australian flag (albeit on crutches) in the Parade of Nations at the Opening Ceremony. He also won two gold medals and a silver medal at the 2004 IPC Alpine Skiing World Championships in Wildschönau, Austria, and a gold and a bronze medal at the 2009 World Championships in Jeongseon, Korea. He retired after the Sochi Games.

Personal
Cameron Rahles-Rahbula was born in Camperdown, Victoria, on 9 July 1983.  He was diagnosed with osteosarcoma, a rare form of bone cancer at the age of 12 and after unsuccessful chemotherapy had his left leg amputated above the knee at the age of 14. He attended a weekend ski camp at Mount Buller organised by Challenge, a children's cancer support network two weeks after his amputation. Within three days, he was able to ski by himself and this was the start of his Paralympic skiing career.

Rahles-Rahbula attended Geelong Grammar School. He went to Timbertop, for a year, where intense physical training — running, hiking and other outdoor programs —  are required. At university, he studied physiotherapy at the University of Melbourne and currently works as a physiotherapist.

He married Emily Jansen on 4 December 2010. Jansen had become Australia's first female Paralympic skier when she competed at the 2006 Winter Paralympics in Torino. They have two sons named Archie and Finn.

In 2023, Rahles-Rahbula was accused of deliberately filming a Geelong Grammar student while she was topless and receiving treatment. Rahles-Rahbula defended himself by saying that his phone accidentally activated during the session and he never intended to record the video.

Career

Rahles-Rahbula's first major success was 2nd place in the giant slalom at the 2001 National Championships at Mount Hotham. He competed at the 2002 Winter Paralympics in Salt Lake City in four LW2 men's events – downhill (9th), slalom (17th), giant slalom (did not finish) and super-G (did not finish). At the 2006 Winter Paralympics in Torino, he competed in four standing events, coming 14th in the slalom and did not finish in the downhill, giant slalom and super-G.

At the 2010 Winter Paralympics in Vancouver, Rahles-Rahbula won bronze medals in the Men's slalom standing event and the Men's super combined standing event. He finished 4th in the downhill, 6th in the giant slalom and 5th in the super-G. He was the Australian flag bearer at the closing ceremony at the 2010 Vancouver Games.

At the 2004 IPC Alpine Skiing World Championships in Wildschönau, Austria, Rahles-Rahbula won two gold medals in the Super-G and Downhill and silver medal in the Slalom. At the 2009 IPC Alpine Skiing World Championships at High Resort 1 in Jeongseon County, Korea, he won a gold medal in the Men's Slalom Standing and a bronze medal in the Men's Giant Slalom Standing. He competed in three events at the 2011 IPC Alpine Skiing World Championships in Sestriere, Italy, but did not win any medals.

The IPC Alpine Skiing World Cup in Thredbo, New South Wales in September 2013 was intended to be his last competition due to the desire to spend more time with his family. At this event, he won a gold medal in the slalom and silver in giant slalom. In December 2013, he announced that he would aim to compete at the 2014 Winter Paralympics in Sochi. His return to competitive skiing with the support of his wife Emily was subject to his training program allowing for more family time.

On 4 March 2014, he was named as the Australian flag bearer at the 2014 Winter Paralympics Opening Ceremony. Less than a day after being named as flag bearer, he had training accident, fracturing his knee and injuring ankle. He was not able to compete in any of his events. He played an important role in supporting the Australian Team during the Games, and announced that he was retiring.

Recognition
 2004 – Young Victorian of the Year for his work with young skiers with a disability.
 2004 – University of Melbourne Sports Athlete of the Year
 2004/2005 – Local Citizen of the Year by Corangamite Shire Council in Victoria
 2010 – Australian Paralympian of the Year and Male Athlete of the Year
 2010 – Australian Flag Bearer for Closing Ceremony at 2010 Winter Paralympics
 2014 – Australian Flag Bearer for Opening Ceremony at 2014 Winter Paralympics

References

External links
 
 

Alpine skiers at the 2002 Winter Paralympics
Alpine skiers at the 2006 Winter Paralympics
Alpine skiers at the 2010 Winter Paralympics
Australian Institute of Sport Paralympic skiers
Paralympic alpine skiers of Australia
Paralympic bronze medalists for Australia
University of Melbourne alumni
Living people
Amputee category Paralympic competitors
Victorian Institute of Sport alumni
1983 births
Medalists at the 2010 Winter Paralympics
Australian male alpine skiers
People educated at Geelong Grammar School
Paralympic medalists in alpine skiing